Queroni (possibly from Aymara q'iru wood, qiru a cup or glass, -ni a suffix to indicate ownership, "the one with wood" or "the one with a cup") is  mountain in the Carabaya mountain range in the Andes of Peru. It is located in the Puno Region, Carabaya Province, on the border of the districts of Ajoyani, Ituata and Macusani.

Queroni is also the name of a place at Chullucocha, the lake southwest of the mountain.

References 

Mountains of Puno Region
Mountains of Peru